Premier, Inc. is an American healthcare improvement company headquartered in Charlotte, North Carolina, and also based out in 43-21 34th St, Long Island City, NY 11101, United States. On October 1, 2013, the company completed its IPO. In 2006, Premier won the Malcolm Baldrige National Quality Award.

In the early 2000s, Premier was a hospital buying group, pooling healthcare purchases to reduce prices.

In 2017, Premier acquired Stanson Health for $51.5 million. In 2019, Premier acquired Medpricer, a healthcare technology firm, for $35 million. In June 2020, Premier partnered with McLaren Health Care to acquire a minority stake in Prestige Ameritech, a manufacturer of PPE.

In 2021, Michael J Alkire appointed as a new CEO of the company.

References 

Health care companies based in North Carolina